Amzabegovo is a village in the municipality of Sveti Nikole, North Macedonia.

It is home of a barely excavated archaeological site.

Geography
Arnautski Dol, the name of a dry valley in the village, stems from the name Arnaut, the Ottoman Turkish rendering for Albanians, suggesting direct linguistic contact with Albanians or the former presence of an assimilated Albanian community.

Demographics
On the 1927 ethnic map of Leonhard Schulze-Jena, the village is written as "Hamzabegovo" and shown as a Turkish village. According to the 2002 census, the village had a total of 543 inhabitants. Ethnic groups in the village include:

Macedonians 531
Serbs 3
Aromanians 8
Others 1

References

Villages in Sveti Nikole Municipality